American settlers is a broad-concept term which may refer to:

 Settlement of the Americas, which began when Paleolithic hunter-gatherers entered North America via the Beringia land bridge from Siberia
 European colonization of the Americas, which began in 1492, when a Spanish expedition headed by the explorer Christopher Columbus sailed west and landed in what came to be known to Europeans as the "New World"
 Colonial history of the United States, European colonization of America from the start of colonization in the early 16th century
 Manifest destiny, the westward movement of settlers across North America
Later migrations of specific groups to the United States:
 History of Chinese Americans includes three major waves of Chinese immigration to the United States with the first beginning in the 19th century
 Cuban immigration to the United States
 Emigration from Mexico, primarily to the United States
 Central American migrant caravans, composed of people who fled gang violence, poverty, and political repression with the goal of settling in the United States

See also
 History of immigration to the United States
 American diaspora, Americans who relocate, temporarily or permanently, to foreign countries

American pioneers
Colonization history of the United States
European colonization of the Americas
Peopling of the Americas